Qom Province is a religious and politically conservative place, with most voters supportive of the principlist tendency.

Active parties 
As of October 2015, there are 22 political organizations active in Qom Province. Both Principlist and Reformist camps are active in the province. Conservative Society of Seminary Teachers of Qom is the most prominent political organization headquartered in Qom. Its reformist rival, Assembly of Qom Seminary Scholars and Researchers, is also based in Qom.

Qom serves as the main ideologic base of the Front of Islamic Revolution Stability (its spiritual leader, Mohammad Taghi Mesbah Yazdi also resides in Qom), which tends to dominate its political arena with concentration on ethnic issues, according to some spectators. Islamic Coalition Party and Front of Followers of the Line of the Imam and the Leader have active branches in the province.

Provincial affiliates of NEDA Party, Democracy Party, Union of Islamic Iran People Party and Islamic Labour Party are among reformist organizations of the province, which has also a reformist "policymaking council".

Election results

Parliament 

Qom has one constituency with three seats, all occupied by principlists.

City councils 
In Qom's City Council, 19 out of 21 members are principlist and the other two are independent.

Current officeholders 

Representative of the Supreme Leader
Mohammad Saeidi (Conservative)
Governor
Mehdi Sadeghi
Parliament
 Ahmad Amirabadi (Conservative)
 Ali Larijani (Conservative)
 Mojtaba Zonnour (Conservative)
Assembly of Experts
 Mohammad Momen (Conservative)

References 

Politics of Iran
Qom Province